Gastón Ezequiel Guruceaga Bracamonte (born 6 April 1990) is an Argentine professional footballer who plays as a right-back for Huércal-Overa.

Career
Guruceaga's career started in the ranks of Newell's Old Boys. He made one appearance in the Primera División for the club, it came in a 3–1 defeat away to Quilmes on 15 April 2011. In the following November, Guruceaga moved to Torneo Argentino A side Tiro Federal. Five appearances followed in 2011–12. Central Córdoba signed Guruceaga on 13 July 2012, with the defender going on to play twenty-seven times whilst scoring his first senior goal - against Los Andes. His sole season with Central Córdoba ended with relegation from Primera B Metropolitana. Guruceaga subsequently joined Sportivo Belgrano of Primera B Nacional.

Having spent three seasons with Sportivo Belgrano, the last campaign being 2015 which concluded with his second career relegation, Los Andes became his fifth club in January 2016; therefore allowing Guruceaga to remain in tier two. After fifty-three appearances across 2016 and 2016–17, Guruceaga switched Argentina for Uruguay by agreeing to join Cerro in 2018. His bow for the Primera División outfit arrived in the Copa Sudamericana versus Sport Rosario on 20 February, he was substituted on for Agustín Sant’Anna in what was the first of just two matches for Cerro. A return to Los Andes in Argentina was completed in June 2018.

Guruceaga left Los Andes in June 2019. In July 2020, Guruceaga joined Spanish Tercera División side Huércal-Overa. He debuted in a goalless draw way to Ciudad de Murcia on 25 October.

Career statistics
.

References

External links

1990 births
Living people
Footballers from Rosario, Santa Fe
Argentine footballers
Association football defenders
Argentine expatriate footballers
Expatriate footballers in Uruguay
Expatriate footballers in Spain
Argentine expatriate sportspeople in Uruguay
Argentine expatriate sportspeople in Spain
Argentine Primera División players
Torneo Argentino A players
Primera B Metropolitana players
Primera Nacional players
Uruguayan Primera División players
Tercera División players
Newell's Old Boys footballers
Tiro Federal footballers
Central Córdoba de Rosario footballers
Sportivo Belgrano footballers
Club Atlético Los Andes footballers
C.A. Cerro players
Huércal-Overa CF players